The AARP Movies for Grownups Award for Best Supporting Actor is one of the AARP Movies for Grownups Awards presented annually by the AARP. The award honors an actor over the age of 50 who has given an outstanding performance in a film in a given year. The awards for Supporting Actor and Supporting Actress were first given at the 7th AARP Movies for Grownups Awards in 2008. Prior to that, the only individual acting awards were for Best Actor and Best Actress.

Winners and Nominees

2000s

2010s

2020s

Actors with multiple nominations

The following individuals received multiple Best Supporting Actor nominations:

Age superlatives

See also
 Academy Award for Best Supporting Actor
 BAFTA Award for Best Actor in a Supporting Role
 Broadcast Film Critics Association Award for Best Supporting Actor
 Golden Globe Award for Best Supporting Actor – Motion Picture
 Independent Spirit Award for Best Supporting Male
 Screen Actors Guild Award for Outstanding Performance by a Male Actor in a Supporting Role

References

Supporting Actor
Film awards for supporting actor